Pseudohydnum gelatinosum is a species of fungus in the order Auriculariales. It has the recommended English name of jelly tooth, with reference to its gelatinous consistency and hydnoid (toothed) undersurface. The species was thought to be cosmopolitan, but recent DNA evidence suggests that it is confined to Europe and northern Asia, with superficially similar but distinct species elsewhere. At least three species occur in North America, but these are currently unnamed. P. gelatinosum grows on dead conifer wood.

The jelly tooth is edible and consumed for food in Bulgaria and Russia. The fungus can be eaten raw.

References

Auriculariales
Fungi described in 1772
Fungi of Asia
Fungi of Europe
Taxa named by Giovanni Antonio Scopoli